Ernst Alex Roets (born 5 September 1985) is a writer and filmmaker in South Africa. He is Deputy CEO of AfriForum and the CEO of the film production company Forum Films.

Education 
Roets grew up in the agricultural town of Tzaneen where he matriculated in 2003 from the Merensky High School. He obtained his LLB degree in 2009 from the University of Pretoria (UP). During his student years he served in various leadership structures, including the Student Representative Council (SRC) and the Senate, at this university.

During his student years Roets served as founding member and the first National Chairperson of Solidarity Youth. In 2008 Solidarity Youth changed its name and the organisation was converted to AfriForum Youth. In 2016, Roets obtained his LLM degree in Public Law with distinction from the UP. The title of his dissertation was ’n Peiling van die middele kragtens die Suid-Afrikaanse Grondwet, ter afdwinging van die basiese regte van minderheidsgemeenskappe.

Career 
Roets was arrested in 2010 after he attempted to install a billboard with the words “Welcome to Pretoria” next to the N1 highway. This action was in protest against the Tshwane Metropolitan Municipality’s use of the word “Tshwane” to refer to the capital during the 2010 Fifa Soccer World Cup.

In 2011 Roets was appointed as Deputy CEO of AfriForum. He testified on behalf of AfriForum in 2011 in the case of AfriForum vs. Malema. On behalf of AfriForum he submitted a charge of hate speech against Julius Malema after Malema sang the song “Dubul' ibhunu” (Shoot the Boer) at various political gatherings. The court found Malema guilty of hate speech.

In May 2018, following criticism of Afriforum by a North-West University professor, Elmien du Plessis, Roets posted a YouTube video where he used an analogy to describe his anger at the denial of the extent of farm murders, by academics like du Plessis, by quoting Victor Klemperer, a Jew who survived the Holocaust, who after the Holocaust wrote that "If one day the situation were reversed and the fate of the vanquished lay in my hands, then I would let all the ordinary folk go and even some of the leaders, who might perhaps after all have had honourable intentions and not known what they were doing. But I would have all the intellectuals strung up, and the professors three feet higher than the rest; they would be left hanging from the lampposts for as long as was compatible with hygiene", referring to his anger at academics and others who in Klemperer's words "had given intellectual support to Nazism".  Following the video posting, du Plessis and her family received threats of violence. A petition condemning the threats against academics was subsequently circulated.

In May 2018, Roets appeared on the American TV news channel Fox News, hosted by Tucker Carlson, to discuss farm murders in South Africa as well as the South African government’s plans to amend the country’s Constitution to allow for expropriation of land without compensation.

Roets has also been interviewed by other platforms such as CNN, Al Jazeera, BBC, ABC News and Russia Today, regarding various issues in South Africa. In 2020, Roets appeared before the United Nations Forum on Minority Issues to make a presentation about hate speech against minorities in South Africa.

In April 2022, Roets was a speaker at the Conservative Political Action Conference in Hungary where he addressed: "South Africa's 46% unemployment, only 5% of citizens paying income tax, 500 000 people murdered since 1994 and the 125 laws discriminating against white people passed by the ANC government".

Personal life 
He is the son of Sarel Arnoldus and Irma Mariette (Née Ernst) of Orania. Roets married Lelanie (née De Kock) on 5 December 2009 and has four children.  He is also part of a heavy metal band called "Soms Wen Die Wolf".

Films and publications

Tainted Heroes 
“Tainted Heroes” is a South African documentary film that was produced by Forum Films under direction of Elrich Yssel, with Roets and Beatrice Pretorius as producers. The film is about the violent battle of the African National Congress (ANC) against apartheid in South Africa between 1976 and 1994. The documentary is based on the book People’s War: New Light on the Struggle for South Africa by Anthea Jeffery.

A spokesperson for the ANC, who are the main protagonists in the film, said "This is nothing else but propaganda. “They should be doing a film about how many of them in AfriForum have collaborated with apartheid. They are nothing else but hardcore racists. They are a group like the Ku Klux Klan (American white supremacist group).”. However, AfriForum and Roets himself have repeatedly denounced "white nationalism", saying that it should be “exposed and opposed”.

Kill the Boer 

“Kill the Boer: Government Complicity in South Africa's Brutal Farm Murders” is a book written by Roets, that sheds light on the brutality of farm murders in South Africa. The book was released on Amazon in January 2019 and is currently listed as an international bestseller.

References 

1985 births
Living people
Afrikaner people
South African civil rights activists
South African film producers
South African male writers
University of Pretoria alumni
People from Tzaneen